Maryland Township is located in Ogle County, Illinois. As of the 2010 census, its population was 535 and it contained 251 housing units.

History
"Whereas,  It appears from a communication from the Auditor of State to the Clerk of the County Court that, by a decision in his office, the names of the Towns [sic Townships] of Harrison, Eagle and Brooklyn must be changed, in pursuance of which the name of the Town is changed to the name of Maryland; the name of the Town of Brooklyn is changed to Rockvale, and the name of the Town of Eagle is changed to the name of Pine Rock." [Nov. 12, 1850]

Geography

Demographics

References

External links 
 US Census
 City-data.com
 Midwest Government Info

Townships in Ogle County, Illinois
Townships in Illinois
1850 establishments in Illinois